The Yamaha PortaSound VSS-200 is a portable musical keyboard released by the Yamaha Corporation in 1988.

The VSS-200 is one of three sampling keyboards in the PortaSound series, along with the VSS-30 and the VSS-100. It uses FM Synthesis to generate sounds and contained 100 presets. It can also record short samples using the built-in microphone, or via a line in on the rear of the unit. It is also possible to sample the internal sounds in order to process them with the DSP effects. Samples can be assigned to the melody (default setting), bass, and chord sections, allowing them to be used as part of the auto accompaniment modes.

The VSS-200 has become a popular keyboard for circuit bending in recent years.

Specifications
49 keys
Up to 6 voice polyphony (depending on the mode used)
100 voice presets
10 rhythm patterns: 8 Beat, 16 Beat, Rock-A-Ballad, Samba, Bossa Nova, Tango, Swing, Disco, Waltz, March
3 Auto Accompaniment modes: Single Finger A.B.C., Auto Bass, Auto Bass Chord
Sample bit depth: 8 Bit
Sample length: 1.9 seconds
Sampling modes: Microphone/Sample Input, Internal voice bank, Overdub
9 DSP effects: Loop, U-Turn, Reverse, Echo, Fuzz, FM, AM, Level, Pitch
ADSR envelope generator
Power source: 9VDC by six "C" size batteries or external power supply.
Output Ports: 6.35mm Headphone/Aux socket
Input Port: Sample In (RCA)

References 

Yamaha synthesizers
Virtual analog synthesizers

External links
  Owner's Guide at manufacturer's site

VSS-200